Justin Simmons is an American politician and former member of the Republican Party who served five terms in the Pennsylvania House of Representatives, representing the 131st District.

Early life and education
Simmons was born in 1986 in Pennsylvania, raised in the Lehigh Valley and graduated from Southern Lehigh High School and Saint Joseph’s University.

He served as an intern for then-Congressman Pat Toomey and later served as a legislative aide for State Senators Rob Wonderling and Bob Mensch, where he conducted research for state legislation. He ran the Northampton County district office and attended events within the district.

He also served as a Republican committeeman in Lehigh County and as president of the Lehigh Valley Young Republicans.

Political career
Simmons was first elected to the Pennsylvania State House in November 2010, defeating incumbent Republican Karen Beyer in the May 2010 primary.

As State Representative, he stated that he favors selling the state liquor stores and reducing the size of the state legislature. He also said he supports term limits, part-time status for members of the General Assembly and operating on a two-year budget cycle. Simmons promised to refuse per diems, a state-owned vehicle and a pension.

In 2020, he announced that he would not seek reelection.

References

External links
State Representative Official website official caucus website
Justin Simmons (R) official Pennsylvania State House website

Living people
Southern Lehigh High School alumni
Republican Party members of the Pennsylvania House of Representatives
Saint Joseph's University alumni
21st-century American politicians
Year of birth missing (living people)